Castagnola-Cassarate is a quarter of the city of Lugano, in the Swiss canton of Ticino. 

Until 1972, it was an independent municipality under the name Castagnola.

Castagnola-Cassarate includes the waterfront on the north side of Lake Lugano from the outfall of the Cassarate River in the west, continuing under Monte Brè to a border with Gandria in the east. It also includes waterfront areas on the opposite, southern, side of Lake Lugano, reaching up to the border with Italy at the summit of Sighignola. The villages and settlements of Caprino, Cassarate, Castagnola, Cavallino, Ruvigliana and Suvigliana are all included.

The municipality of Castagnola had 157 inhabitants in 1591, which increased to 214 in 1801, 419 in 1850, 1,060 in 1900, 2,926 in 1950, 4,430 in 1970, and  5,509 in 1991.

References

External links
 
 Castagnola-Cassarate pages on City of Lugano web site (in Italian)
  Lugano Monte Brè

Districts of Lugano
Former municipalities of Ticino